Daniil Andreyevich Khlusevich (born 26 February 2001) is a Ukrainian-born Russian football player. He plays as a right midfielder for FC Spartak Moscow and the Russia national team.

Club career
He made his debut for the main squad of FC Arsenal Tula on 26 September 2018 in a Russian Cup game against FC Sakhalin Yuzhno-Sakhalinsk. He made his Russian Premier League debut for Arsenal on 4 July 2020 in a game against FC Dynamo Moscow, replacing Aleksandr Lomovitsky in the 83rd minute. He made his first start in the next game against PFC Krylia Sovetov Samara on 7 July 2020.

On 1 November 2021, he signed a 4.5-year contract with FC Spartak Moscow beginning on 1 January 2022. He won the Russian Cup on 29 May 2022.

International career
Khlusevich was called up to the Russia national football team for the first time for a friendly against Kyrgyzstan in September 2022. He made his debut in that game on 24 September 2022.

Personal life
He acquired citizenship of Russia in 2014 after the annexation of Crimea from Ukraine.

Honours
Spartak Moscow
Russian Cup: 2021–22

Career statistics

Club

International

References

External links
 
 

2001 births
Sportspeople from Simferopol
Ukrainian emigrants to Russia
Naturalised citizens of Russia
Russians in Ukraine
Living people
Ukrainian footballers
Russian footballers
Russia under-21 international footballers
Russia international footballers
Association football midfielders
FC Arsenal Tula players
FC Spartak Moscow players
Russian Premier League players